Ernest III may refer to:

 Ernest III, Duke of Brunswick-Grubenhagen (1518–1567)
 Ernest III, Duke of Saxe-Hildburghausen (1655–1715)
 Ernest III, Duke of Saxe-Coburg-Saalfeld (1784–1844)